The 2022 Maine gubernatorial election took place on November 8, 2022, to elect the governor of Maine. Incumbent Democratic governor Janet Mills won re-election to a second term, defeating Republican nominee and former governor, Paul LePage. Neither candidate faced any primary opposition. An independent candidate, Sam Hunkler, received 2% of the vote, the lowest total for a third party or independent candidate since 1982. This was also the first gubernatorial election in Maine since 1990 in which the winner was from the same party as the incumbent president. With over 376,000 votes, Mills won more votes than any other gubernatorial candidate in Maine history, breaking her own record set four years earlier. Mills's 13 point margin of victory was the largest for a statewide Democratic candidate since George J. Mitchell won over 80% of the vote in the 1988 United States Senate election. Mills's victory was also the largest for any gubernatorial candidate since incumbent Angus King won 59% of the vote in 1998.

Democratic primary

Candidates

Nominee
Janet Mills, Governor of Maine (2019–present)

Failed to qualify for ballot access
John Glowa, wildlife activist from China, Maine

Declined
 Troy Jackson, President of the Maine Senate (2018–present) (endorsed Mills)

Endorsements

Results

Republican primary

Candidates

Nominee
 Paul LePage, former Governor of Maine (2011–2019)

Failed to qualify for ballot access
 Michael Heath, activist

Filed paperwork
 Martin Vachon

Endorsements

Results

Independents

Candidates

Declared 
Sam Hunkler, physician

Declined 
Thomas Saviello, former state senator (2010–2018)

General election
With no other candidates challenging Mills or LePage in their respective primaries, the campaign started out with most prediction models giving Mills a slight edge over LePage. However, Maine had not elected a governor from the same party as the President since 1990, and some Democrats were afraid that Democratic President Joe Biden's low approval ratings would hurt Mills.

Access to abortion became a crucial issue following the Supreme Court's ruling in Dobbs v. Jackson Women's Health Organization, which overturned Roe v. Wade and eliminated the constitutional right to abortion, effectively returning the issue to the states. Following the leak of the draft opinion, Mills released a statement saying "I do not consider the rights of women to be dispensable. And I pledge that as long as I am governor, I will fight with everything I have to protect reproductive rights and to preserve access to reproductive health care in the face of every and any threat to it – whether from politicians in Augusta or Supreme Court Justices in Washington." 

After the release of the draft opinion, LePage stated he supported some abortion restrictions, but pledged to preserve access to abortion in cases of rape, incest and life of the mother. However, this was seen as a reversal over his previous statements, including one in 2016 where he said that "we should not have abortion," and a 2018 statement in support of overturning Roe v. Wade. LePage would continue to struggle with questions on abortion, and a stumble in a debate with Mills on the topic led to national headlines.

Over the course of the campaign, Mills developed a fundraising advantage over LePage, while outside groups unaffiliated with either campaign broke records for spending, mostly on negative ads. Ads supporting Mills's candidacy or opposing LePage's candidacy accounted for over $9 million in spending, while ads supporting LePage or opposing Mills accounted for over $7 million.

Polls released after the primaries showed Mills having a moderate-to-large lead over LePage, with the closest poll showing her ahead by six points.

Mills was declared the winner by the Associated Press shortly before midnight on November 8. LePage did not immediately concede the race, but did concede on November 9 with a written statement. In his election night remarks, LePage concluded that he "missed the message" on abortion. Some observers saw the results as symbolic of the decline of the once-dominant Maine Republican Party, and Maine's movement towards becoming a solid blue state.

In the election, Mills broke her own record set four years earlier for most votes received by a Maine gubernatorial candidate.

Predictions

Endorsements

Polling
Aggregate polls

Graphical summary

Debates

Results

See also
 2022 United States gubernatorial elections
 2022 Maine elections

Notes

Partisan clients

References

External links 
Official campaign websites
 Sam Hunkler (I) for Governor
 Paul LePage (R) for Governor
 Janet Mills (D) for Governor

2022
Maine
Gubernatorial